Rajko Hrvat (born 25 September 1986) is a Slovenian rower. He won the silver medal in the men's lightweight single scull at the 2015 World Rowing Championships.

External links

1986 births
Living people
Slovenian male rowers

World Rowing Championships medalists for Slovenia
21st-century Slovenian people